Laetitia Dugain (born 27 November 1992 in Annecy) is a French former artistic gymnast. She competed at the 2008 Summer Olympics.

References

1992 births
Living people
French female artistic gymnasts
Gymnasts at the 2008 Summer Olympics
Olympic gymnasts of France
Sportspeople from Annecy
21st-century French women